The Boston Park Plaza is a historic hotel in Boston, Massachusetts, United States, opened on March 10, 1927. It was built by hotelier E.M. Statler as part of his Statler Hotels chain. A prototype of the grand American hotel, it was called a "city within a city" and also contains an adjoining office building. It was the first hotel in the world to offer in-room radio in every room.

History 
During the hotel's construction, it was discovered that the Statler's planned 155 foot height exceeded the maximum height of  allowed by the Massachusetts State Building Code. However the building was granted a special exemption by Mayor James Michael Curley, making it the tallest building in the city for a time, with the exception of the Boston Custom House. The building, filling an entire triangular city block, has two uses. The western half houses the hotel, while the eastern half has, since the building's construction, served as offices.

The hotel opened on March 10, 1927 as the Statler Hotel Boston. The Statler chain was sold to Hilton Hotels in 1954 and the hotel was renamed the Statler Hilton  in 1958. In December 1976 Hilton announced its plan to close the Statler Hilton Boston, which was prevented when the Irving M. Saunders family purchased the hotel and renamed it The Boston Park Plaza Hotel & Towers. The Saunders Hotel Group (Roger Saunders and sons) sold the Boston Park Plaza in 1997 to Starwood. In 2011, Starwood sold the hotel for $126 million to a partnership between Highgate Hotels, Rockpoint Group, and the Donald Saunders Family, LLC. Two years later the Highgate/Rockpoint/Saunders partnership sold the hotel for $250 million to the Sunstone Hotel Investors REIT who retained Highgate to manage the hotel, and shortened the hotel's name to simply Boston Park Plaza. In 2016 Sunstone completed a $100 million renovation of the hotel and received a Four Diamond Award from AAA.

In 2010, the hotel's Swan's Cafe was named one of the Top 5 Tea Houses in New England by Yankee magazine; it has since closed. From 1994 through 2018, the Boston Park Plaza was a member of Historic Hotels of America, the official program of the National Trust for Historic Preservation.

Other tenants 
The Statler Hotel building was also home to the Northern Jurisdiction of the Scottish Rite from 1927 to 1968, and radio station WEZE's broadcast studio from 1957 to 1977. George Carlin worked briefly as a DJ at WEZE in 1957. TWA and Delta had ticket offices in the building until 1998 and 2000 respectively. In the late 1960s, the University of Massachusetts Boston leased part of the building and converted it into faculty and departmental office space. The building has also served as the venue for Anthro New England, a furry convention held in the Greater Boston area.

Park Plaza Castle 
The hotel used to operate the Park Plaza Castle, a banquet facility located in the adjacent former Armory of the First Corps of Cadets building, listed on the National Register of Historic Places.

See also

References

External links 
 Boston Park Plaza Hotel official website
 Park Plaza Building official website

1927 establishments in Massachusetts
Hotel buildings completed in 1927
Hotels established in 1927
Hotels in Boston